Bottom Live 2003: Weapons Grade Y-Fronts Tour is the fifth and final live stage show based on the UK TV series Bottom. It ran in 2003 (ten years after the first stage show) and was recorded for VHS and DVD release at the Cliffs Pavilion Theatre in Southend-on-Sea. It was written by and starred Rik Mayall as Richie and Adrian Edmondson as Eddie.

Plot

Act one
No longer on Hooligan's Island, Richie and Eddie find themselves back in their flat in Hammersmith. Having locked himself in the lavatory for fifteen days, Eddie is disrupted when Richie barges in, discovering that his friend has transformed the room into a laboratory. Inside are various inventions, including "The Evacuator", a super-powerful vacuum cleaner that Eddie uses as a toilet, "The Patent Painless Tattoo Remover", alias a blunt hammer, and "Weapons Grade Lager", a self-perpetuating alcoholic drink that leads to a prolonged period of unconsciousness. Richie then discovers a trunk sent to him from his deceased uncle Peregrine Richard. Inside are the plans for the various inventions Eddie has supposedly either stolen or plagiarized. However, one invention remains untouched: Peregrine Richard's "elixir of life". Richie hurriedly drinks the potion hoping to gain immortality but is shocked when Eddie discovers that the substance is poisonous. In order to save his friend, Eddie reluctantly uses his very own time-traveling toilet (i.e. the "TURDIS"), to reverse time and stop Richie from drinking the Elixir. Fully restored, they realize that they can use the TURDIS to reach the theatre's bar before the audience, and depart immediately.

Act two
Richie and Eddie continue their search for the bar, having been unsuccessful for  years. During their escapades, Eddie manages to lodge Richie's head in the TURDIS door and dislodge it with a dynamite stick, Richie is forced to re-power the ship via friction he causes by pleasuring himself (leading to a mass-heckle from the theatre audience as orchestrated by Eddie). As an unforeseen result, the pair find themselves traveling further and further back through time, right back to the beginning of time itself. After a narrow escape from his shrinking underpants (triggered by the reversal of time), Eddie joins Richie as they discover the meaning of everything: pants (thanks to the appearance of the Mother Pants), and they depart by singing an ode to the ever-useful undergarment.

Trivia
As Richie, Rik Mayall once again mentions his quad bike accident he had in 1998 and suggests that Eddie caused it: "It's just like the last time, except this time Eddie isn't standing there with a brake cable in one hand and some scissors in the other." To which Eddie grins and mimes holding something and cutting across it.
Both Rik and Ade impersonate Rick and Vyvyan out of The Young Ones much to the delight of the audience. To which Rik, as Richie, casually tells Ade that he hasn't changed his material very much. Corpsing, Eddie replies, "Stick with what works, that's my motto."
The name of Eddie's time-traveling toilet, the TURDIS, is a direct parody of the TARDIS from the sci-fi series Doctor Who.
 This was Rik and Ade's last proper Bottom project together.

Tour dates

See also 
Bottom (TV series)

References 

Bottom (TV series)
Films about time travel